Yelena Yurievna Gagarina (born 17 April 1959, Zapolyarny, Murmansk Oblast, RSFSR, USSR) is a Soviet and Russian art historian. She is the General Director of the State historical and cultural Museum-reserve Moscow Kremlin Museums (since 2001), and the eldest daughter of the first cosmonaut Yuri Gagarin.

Career

Gagarina graduated from MSU Faculty of History; her specialty is the history of art. She has been a member of the Commission of the Russian Federation for UNESCO since 16 March 2005.

In 2014, she signed a Collective appeal of cultural figures of the Russian Federation in support of the policy of President Vladimir Putin in Ukraine and Crimea.

Personal life
Gagarina is the daughter of the Soviet cosmonaut, Yuri Gagarin. She grew up in Zvyozdny gorodok, the space training facility known as Star City. American immigrant Anna Gagarina is a granddaughter of Yuri's younger brother Boris, and so is the daughter of Yelena's cousin.

References

External links 
 Биография на сайте Международного комитета по наградам Фаберже
 Интервью 2009 года газете «Известия»

1959 births
Living people
People from Pechengsky District
Directors of museums in Russia
Women museum directors
Soviet art historians
Russian art historians
Russian women historians
Yuri Gagarin
Moscow Kremlin
20th-century Russian historians
21st-century Russian historians
Academic staff of Moscow State University
Honorary Members of the Russian Academy of Arts
Commanders of the Order of Merit of the Italian Republic
Officiers of the Légion d'honneur
Recipients of the Order "For Merit to the Fatherland", 4th class
Curators from Moscow